Congregate care may refer to:
 Congregate care in the United States
 Residential child care community
 Residential treatment center